The Fly Synthesis Syncro is an Italian ultralight and light-sport aircraft, designed and produced by Fly Synthesis, introduced at the Aero show held in Friedrichshafen in 2009. The aircraft is supplied as a complete ready-to-fly-aircraft.

Design and development
The aircraft was designed to comply with the Fédération Aéronautique Internationale microlight rules and US light-sport aircraft rules. It features a cantilever high-wing, a two-seats-in-side-by-side configuration enclosed open cockpit, fixed tricycle landing gear and a single engine in tractor configuration.

The aircraft is made from composites, predominantly carbon fibre. The standard engine available is the  Rotax 912ULS four-stroke powerplant.

Operational history
Reviewer Marino Boric described the design in a 2015 review as "one of the most attractive aircraft unveiled at the 2009 Friedrichshafen show".

Variants
Syncro ULM
Model for the European FAI microlight category with  gross weight.
Syncro LSA
Model for the US LSA category with  gross weight.

Specifications (Syncro ULM)

References

External links

2000s Italian ultralight aircraft
Light-sport aircraft
High-wing aircraft
Single-engined tractor aircraft